The Asian stinging catfish or fossil cat (Heteropneustes fossilis) is a species of airsac catfish found in India, Bangladesh, Pakistan, Nepal, Sri Lanka, Thailand,  Myanmar, and Bhutan. It has also been introduced to the Tigris River Basin in Iran.

H. fossilis is found mainly in ponds, ditches, swamps, and marshes, but sometimes occurs in muddy rivers. It can tolerate slightly brackish water. It is omnivorous. This species breeds in confined waters during the monsoon, but can breed in ponds, derelict ponds, and ditches when sufficient rain water accumulates. It is in great demand due to its alleged medicinal value.

The stinging catfish is able to deliver a painful sting to humans. Poison from a gland on its pectoral fin spine has been known to be extremely painful.

It is also farmed and found in the aquarium trade.

In India in Kerala, it is locally called as kadu (Malayalam:കടു) or karri (Malayalam:കാരി). It is highly preferred in Assam and locally known as xingi maas (Assamese: শিঙি মাছ) or "na singgi" (Bodo). In Bangladesh, this fish is called singi mach (Bengali: শিং মাছ), In Sri Lanka, this fish is called   by the Sinhala-speaking community.

References

Heteropneustes
Fish described in 1794
Fish of Asia
Freshwater fish of Sri Lanka